Baiga may refer to:

Baiga tribe, tribe in India 
Paingar, pinyin Baiga, township in Tibet